Fredrik Olsson (born 4 February 1985) is a Swedish football player, who most recently played for Jönköpings Södra IF. He has played six seasons for Landskrona BoIS, between 2008 and 2013. He made 136 appearances and scored 49 goals for Landskrona in total, and became the club's top scorer in 2009, 2011, 2012 and 2013. Prior to signing for BoIS, he played for the local rivals Helsingborgs IF and Mjällby AIF. He has made appearances for his country in different youth teams.

References

External links
 
 
 

1985 births
Living people
Swedish footballers
Sweden youth international footballers
Allsvenskan players
Superettan players
Mjällby AIF players
Helsingborgs IF players
Landskrona BoIS players
Halmstads BK players
Association football forwards
People from Karlshamn
Sportspeople from Blekinge County